Pretenellin A is a secondary metabolite in Aspergillus oryzae. Pretenellin A is a substrate for tenellin because it undergoes an oxidative ring expansion to form Pretenellin B followed by N-hydroxylation to form Tenellin, an iron chelator in entomopathegnic fungus.

Biosynthesis 
Pretenellin A is biosynthesized using acetate in the initiation module. The acetate molecule is then extended four times by iterative PKS (Figure 1). The specific methylations occur after the first and second elongation module. After the four elongation module, the β-ketopentaketide is brought into close proximity with tyrosine which is attached to a non-ribosomal peptide synthetase (NRPS) (Figure 2). When the iterative PKS interacts with the NRPS system Pretenellin A is released, acting as a well-regulated off-loading mechanism thus releasing Pretenellin A.

References 

Secondary metabolites
Aspergillus compounds
Phenols
Pyrroles
Dienes
Ketones